Szigetcsép is a village in Pest county, Hungary. The Csepel Island has two villages, Lórév (Lovra) and Szigetscép (Čip), and the town of Ráckeve which is inhabited by Serbs as well as Hungarians and Germans. In this Hungarian village, approximately one hundred Serbs are living with Hungarians and Germans. The majority of the old Serbian population moved from Szigetcsép to Serbia in 1924 to settle in the village of Bački Brestovac.

Twin towns - twin cities
  Săcueni – Romania

References

Populated places in Pest County
Serb communities in Hungary